Uru-ka-gina, Uru-inim-gina, or Iri-ka-gina (24th century BC, middle chronology) was King of the city-states of Lagash and Girsu in Mesopotamia, and the last ruler of the 1st Dynasty of Lagash. He assumed the title of king, claiming to have been divinely appointed, upon the downfall of his corrupt predecessor, Lugalanda.

He is best known for his reforms to combat corruption, which are sometimes cited as the first example of a legal code in recorded history. Although the actual text has not been discovered, much of its content may be surmised from other references to it that have been found. In it, he exempted widows and orphans from taxes; compelled the city to pay funeral expenses (including the ritual food and drink libations for the journey of the dead into the lower world); and decreed that the rich must use silver when purchasing from the poor, and if the poor does not wish to sell, the powerful man (the rich man or the priest) cannot force him to do so.

He also participated in several conflicts, notably a losing border conflict with Uruk. In the seventh year of his reign, Uruk fell under the leadership of Lugal-Zage-Si, énsi of Umma, who ultimately annexed most of the territory of Lagash and established the first reliably documented kingdom to encompass all of Sumer. The destruction of Lagash was described in a lament (possibly the earliest recorded example of what would become a prolific Sumerian literary genre), which stressed that "the men of Umma ... committed a sin against Ningirsu. ... Offence there was none in Urukagina, king of Girsu, but as for Lugal-Zage-Si, governor of Umma, may his goddess Nisaba make him carry his sin upon his neck" (alternatively – "may she carry his sin upon her neck"). Lugal-Zage-Si himself was soon defeated and his kingdom was annexed by Sargon of Akkad.

Reforms
Urukagina's code has been widely hailed as the first recorded example of government reform, seeking to achieve a higher level of freedom and equality. It limited the power of the priesthood and large property owners, and took measures against usury, burdensome controls, hunger, theft, murder, and seizure (of people's property and persons); as he states, "The widow and the orphan were no longer at the mercy of the powerful man". Here, the word "freedom" ("ama-gi"), appears for the first time in recorded history.

Despite these apparent attempts to curb the excesses of the elite class, it seems elite or royal women enjoyed even greater influence and prestige in his reign than previously. Urukagina greatly expanded the royal "Household of Women" from about 50 persons to about 1500 persons, renamed it the "Household of goddess Bau", gave it ownership of vast amounts of land confiscated from the former priesthood, and placed it under the supervision of his wife, Shasha (or Shagshag). In his second year of reign, Shasha presided over the lavish funeral of his predecessor's queen, Baranamtarra, who had been an important personage in her own right.

In addition to such changes, two of his other surviving decrees, first published and translated by Samuel Kramer in 1964, have attracted controversy in recent decades. First, he seems to have abolished the former custom of polyandry in his country, on pain of the woman taking multiple husbands being stoned with rocks upon which her crime is written. Second is a statute stating that "if a woman says [text illegible...] to a man, her mouth is crushed with burnt bricks."  No comparable laws from Urukagina addressing penalties for adultery by men have survived. The discovery of these fragments has led some modern critics to assert that they provide "the first written evidence of the degradation of women".

Excerpt of some regulations from the Reform document

 From the border territory of Ningirsu to the sea, no person shall serve as officers.
 For a corpse being brought to the grave, his beer shall be 3 jugs and his bread 80 loaves. One bed and one lead goat shall the undertaker take away, and 3 ban (18 l.) of barley shall the person(s) take away. 
 When to the reeds of Enki a person has been brought, his beer will be 4 jugs, and his bread 420 loaves. One barig (36 l.) of barley shall the undertaker take away, and 3 ban of barley shall the persons of ... take away. One woman's headband, and one sila (1 l.) of princely fragrance shall the eresh-dingir priestess take away. 420 loaves of bread that have sat are the bread duty, 40 loaves of hot bread are for eating, and 10 loaves of hot bread are the bread of the table. 5 loaves of bread are for the persons of the levy, 2 mud vessels and 1 sadug vessel of beer are for the lamentation singers of Girsu. 490 loaves of bread, 2 mud vessels and 1 sadug vessel of beer are for the lamentation singers of Lagash. 406 loaves of bread, 2 mud vessels, and 1 sadug vessel of beer are for the other lamentation singers. 250 loaves of bread and one mud vessel of beer are for the old wailing women.  180 loaves of bread and 1 mud vessel of beer are for the men of Nigin. 
 The blind one who stands in ..., his bread for eating is one loaf, 5 loaves of bread are his at midnight, one loaf is his bread at midday, and 6 loaves are his bread in the evening.
 60 loaves of bread, 1 mud vessel of beer, and 3 ban of barley are for the person who is to perform as the sagbur priest, king, or god.

Praise poem of Urukagina

Some insight into Sumerian values can be gained from praise poems written for kings. While the kings may not always live up to this praise they show the type of achievements that they wished to be remembered by. Extracts below praise Urukagina who appears as a social reformer, getting rid of gross abuses of power that had taken hold in Lagash.

 Since time immemorial, since life began, in those days, the head boatman appropriated boats, the livestock official appropriated asses, the livestock official appropriated sheep, and the fisheries inspector appropriated.... The shepherds of wool sheep paid a duty in silver on account of white sheep, and the surveyor, chief lamentation-singer, supervisor, brewer and foremen paid a duty in silver on account of young lambs. . . These were the conventions of former times!
 When Ningirsu, warrior of Enlil, granted the kingship of Lagash to Urukagina, selecting him from among the myriad people, he replaced the customs of former times, carrying out the command that Ningirsu, his master, had given him.
 He removed the head boatman from control over the boats, he removed the livestock official from control over asses and sheep, he removed the fisheries inspector from control....
 He removed the silo supervisor from control over the grain taxes of the guda-priests, he removed the bureaucrat responsible for the paying of duties in silver on account of white sheep and young lambs, and he removed the bureaucrat responsible for the delivery of duties by the temple administrators to the palace.
 The... administrators no longer plunder the orchards of the poor. When a high quality ass is born to a shublugal, and his foreman says to him, "I want to buy it from you"; whether he lets him buy it from him and says to him "Pay me the price I want!," or whether he does not let him buy it from him, the foreman must not strike at him in anger.
 When the house of an aristocrat adjoins the house of a shublugal, and the aristocrat says to him, "I want to buy it from you"; whether he lets him buy it from him, having said to him, "Pay me the price I want! My house is a large container—fill it with barley for me!," or whether he does not let him buy it from him, that aristocrat must not strike at him in anger.
 He cleared and cancelled obligations for those indentured families, citizens of Lagash living as debtors because of grain taxes, barley payments, theft or murder.
 Urukagina solemnly promised Ningirsu that he would never subjugate the waif and the widow to the powerful.

Lament about the fall of Lagash to Umma

Urukagina participated in several conflicts, notably a losing border conflict with Uruk. In the seventh year of his reign, Uruk fell under the leadership of Lugal-Zage-Si, énsi of Umma, who ultimately annexed most of the territory of Lagash and established the first reliably documented kingdom to encompass all of Sumer. The destruction of Lagash was described in a lament (possibly the earliest recorded example of what would become a prolific Sumerian literary genre), which stressed that:

 

Lugal-Zage-Si himself was soon defeated and his kingdom was annexed by Sargon of Akkad.

See also

List of ancient legal codes

Notes

External links
 Reforms of Urukagina – 2015 composite Sumerian text with translation, together with editions of individual cones
 Urukagina's "reform document" (in Sumerian) A, B, C
 
 "Inscriptions from the Ancient Near East" – includes a complete translation of the reform document and the lament in Italian
 "The Law Reforms of King Uru-inimgina of Lagash", pp. 8–10 in Women, Crime and Punishment in Ancient Law and Society by Elizabeth Meier Tetlow, 2004 – a comprehensive examination of all the ways Uruinimga's reforms both positively and adversely affected the status of women in Lagash.
 Urukagina, the reformist king. A complete description of the reign of Urukagina and his social reforms.

24th-century BC Sumerian kings
Kings of Lagash
Ancient legislators
3rd-millennium BC births
3rd-millennium BC deaths